Flip, FLIP, or flips may refer to:

People
 Flip (nickname), a list of people
 Lil' Flip (born 1981), American rapper
 Flip Simmons, Australian actor and musician
 Flip Wilson, American comedian

Arts and entertainment

Fictional characters
 Flip (Little Nemo), a cartoon character
 Flip, the title character of Flip's Twisted World, a video game
 Flip the Frog, a cartoon character
 Flip the grasshopper, a character in the children's book The Adventures of Maya the Bee

Music
 Flip Records (1950s), a rhythm and blues and doo-wop label based in Los Angeles
 Flip Records (1994), a record label in California
 Flips, a short name of The Flaming Lips, an American rock band formed in 1983
 Flip (album), a 1985 solo album by Nils Lofgren
 The Flip (album), a 1969 album by jazz saxophonist Hank Mobley

Business
 Flip or Flipping, an American term for buying and reselling something quickly, particularly real estate
 Flip Burger Boutique, a chain of gourmet hamburger restaurants in the southern United States
 Flip Skateboards, a skateboard and clothing company

Events
 Festa Literária Internacional de Paraty, or FLIP, an annual literary festival in Paraty, Brazil
 Festival Ludique International de Parthenay, or FLIP, a games fair in Parthenay, France
 Flip Animation Festival, Wolverhampton (UK) based international animation festival

Mathematics and statistics
 Flip (mathematics), an operation in algebraic geometry
 Reflection (mathematics), sometimes called flip, an operation that preserves distances
 Coin flip, a coin toss with a 50/50 chance of "heads" or "tails"

Science and technology
 Flip (form), a hinged form factor for handheld electronic devices
 Fast Local Internet Protocol, or FLIP, a suite of internet protocols
 FLICE-like inhibitory protein (see CFLAR), protein involved in apoptosis
 Flip Video, a video camcorder
 Fluorescence loss in photobleaching, or FLIP, a microscopy technique
 Freenet Lightweight Irc Program, or FLIP, a plugin for Freenet allowing irc-like chat
 RV FLIP ("Floating Instrument Platform"), a research vessel
 Functional Lumen Imaging Probe (FLIP) is a test used to evaluate the function of the esophagus
 Flip (software), a video discussion platform by Microsoft for use in classrooms

Sports
 Flip (acrobatic), a leap followed by one or more revolutions while airborne
 Flip jump, a figure skating element
 "The Flip", a baseball play made in the 2001 American League Division Series by Derek Jeter

Other uses
 Flip (cocktail)
 Franklin Large Igneous Province (FLIP), a large area of igneous rock in northern North America
 Flip page, the visual effect of turning pages in digital publications
 Flip hairstyle, a hairstyle popular in the 1960s
 A derogatory term pertaining to Filipinos and Filipino-Americans
 An American colloquialism for turning state's evidence

See also
 
 Flippin (disambiguation)
 Flop (disambiguation)
 Flipped (disambiguation)
 Flipper (disambiguation)